Bird's eye chili or Thai chili ( owing to its shape) is a chili pepper, a variety from the species Capsicum annuum native to Mexico. Cultivated across Southeast Asia, it is used extensively in many Asian cuisines. It may be mistaken for a similar-looking chili derived from the species Capsicum frutescens, the cultivar "siling labuyo". Capsicum frutescens fruits are generally smaller and characteristically point upwards.

Description 

The bird's eye chili plant is a perennial with small, tapering fruits, often two or three, at a node. The fruits are very pungent.

The bird's eye chili is small, but is quite hot. It measures around 50,000 - 100,000 Scoville units, which is less than a habanero, but many times hotter than the spiciest jalapeños.

Origins 
All chilis found around the world today have their origins in Mexico, Central America, and South America. They were spread by Spanish and Portuguese colonists, missionaries, and traders, together with many other now common crops such as maize, tomatoes and pineapples through the Columbian Exchange. The chili varieties found in Southeast Asia today were brought there in the 16th or 17th century.

Uses by humans

As food 

In Indonesian cuisine, these chilis are widely used in a variety of dishes and sambals. 

In Vietnamese cuisine, these chilis are used in soups, salads, and stir-fried dishes. They are also put in a wide variety of sauces, pastes, and marinades, used as a condiment or eaten raw, both fresh and dried.

In Thai cuisine, these chilis are highly valued for their fruity taste and extreme spiciness. They are extensively used in many Thai dishes, such as in Thai curries and in Thai salads, green as well as the ripe red chilis; or they can just be eaten raw on the side, with for instance, khao kha mu (stewed pork trotter served with rice).

As ornamentals 
The more decorative, but slightly less pungent chili, sometimes known as "Thai ornamental", has peppers that point upward on the plant, and range from green to yellow, orange, and then red. It is the basis for the hybrid cultivar "Numex twilight", essentially the same, but less pungent, and starting with purple fruit, creating a rainbow effect. These peppers can grow wild in places such as Saipan and Guam.

See also 
List of Capsicum cultivars
African bird's eye chili

References 

Spices
Chili peppers
Capsicum cultivars